Conogaster is a genus of bristle flies in the family Tachinidae.

Species
Conogaster pruinosa (Meigen, 1824)

Distribution
Turkmenistan, Czech Republic, Hungary, Romania, Slovakia, Ukraine, Andorra, Bulgaria, Croatia, Greece, Italy, Portugal, Spain, Austria, France, Switzerland, Mongolia, Russia, Transcaucasia.

References

Diptera of Europe
Diptera of Asia
Exoristinae
Tachinidae genera
Taxa named by Friedrich Moritz Brauer
Taxa named by Julius von Bergenstamm